Mongol gutals or gutuls (singular: gutal, mong. гутал) are leather boots that are a traditional footwear of Mongolia. Some unique features of the boots include slightly upturned tip of the toes, different varieties of leather ornaments and vertically uneven cuts at the entering holes of the footwear. Gutals can be used especially as horseback riding and wrestling footwear. The left and the right boot are identical to each other, which means that they aren't specifically meant for right- nor left-leaning leg.

Gutals are still commonly used by the modern ethnic Mongols.

Pop culture

Video games
In the 2020 video game Ghost of Tsushima, it is possible to find an artifact item that represents traditional Mongolian gutal boots.

Graphic novels
There is some speculation that, in the comic book Dragon Ball, a character called Gokū regularly wears boots that might be originally inspired by gutals.

Gallery
Different designs of gutal boots:

See also
 Deel

References

External links
 Pictures of all basic components included in Mongol gutal 

Mongolian fashion
Shoes